Strančice is a municipality and village in Prague-East District in the Central Bohemian Region of the Czech Republic. It has about 2,600 inhabitants.

Administrative parts
Villages of Kašovice, Otice, Předboř, Sklenka, Svojšovice and Všechromy are administrative parts of Strančice.

Notable people
Emil Kolben (1862–1943), engineer and entrepreneur

Gallery

References

Villages in Prague-East District